Several players for the Slovak football team ŠK Slovan Bratislava have been outstanding, in terms of goalscoring or in terms of appearances for the  Slovak or Czechoslovak national teams.

Most goals 
 Jozef Adamec   170
 Emil Pažický   123
 Anton Moravčík 109
 Marián Masný   103
 Ján Čapkovič   100

Best scorers  
 Emil Pažický    19 (1954/55)
 Ján Čapkovič    19 (1971/72)
 Marián Masný    16 (1980/81)
 Peter Dubovský  22 (1991/92), 23 (1992/93)
 Pavol Masaryk   15 (2008/09)

Most matches in national team 
 Marián Masný    75
 Róbert Vittek   74
 Ján Popluhár    62
 Szilárd Németh  59
 Anton Ondruš    58

ŠK Slovan Bratislava